"Hey Lover" is a 1988 song recorded by Freddie Jackson. Co-written by up-and-coming singer/songwriter Keith Washington (who would have his breakthrough as a recording artist three years later with the song "Kissing You") and Arthur "Sonny" Moore, the single was Jackson's follow-up to "Nice 'N' Slow" on the album Don't Let Love Slip Away, and like his previous single, "Hey Lover" went to number one on the Black Singles chart.

See also
 List of number-one R&B singles of 1988 (U.S.)

References

1988 singles
Freddie Jackson songs
1988 songs
Songs written by Keith Washington